Agreement on the Conservation of Small Cetaceans of the Baltic, North East Atlantic, Irish and North Seas, often abbreviated to ASCOBANS, is a regional agreement on the protection of small cetaceans that was concluded as the Agreement on the Conservation of Small Cetaceans of the Baltic and North Seas under the auspices of the UNEP Convention on Migratory Species, or Bonn Convention, in September 1991 and came into force in March 1994. In February 2008, an extension of the agreement area came into force which changed the name to “Agreement on the Conservation of Small Cetaceans of the Baltic, North East Atlantic, Irish and North Seas”. ASCOBANS covers all species of toothed whales (Odontoceti) in the Agreement Area, with the exception of the sperm whale (Physeter macrocephalus).

Background
Numerous species of small cetaceans live in the Baltic, Irish and North Seas and the North East Atlantic, including dolphins, whales and harbour porpoises. The harbour porpoise is the most common small cetacean species in the North Sea and the only cetacean species native to the Baltic Sea and therefore is the flagship species of the Agreement.
As migratory species, cetaceans face of a number of threats caused by human activities. These include habitat loss, marine pollution, acoustic disturbances from various sources and, most importantly, incidental catch by entanglement in fishing gear, so-called bycatch. Every year, thousands of whales, dolphins and porpoises fall victim to bycatch, drowning because they can no longer swim up to the surface for a breath of air.

Organisational structure
The Agreement has three main bodies that collaborate towards the implementation of ASCOBANS:

Meeting of the Parties
The Meeting of the Parties is the decision-making body of the Agreement. It meets every three years to assess progress and develop further steps in the implementation of ASCOBANS. Apart from the Member States, Non-Party Range States and relevant regional, intergovernmental and non-governmental organisations can attain observer status to attend MOP meetings  without having a decision-making mandate themselves.

Advisory Committee
Each Party to the Agreement can nominate one member and a number of advisors to the Advisory Committee, which meets once a year. The role of the Committee is to provide scientific and policy advice to the Secretariat (see below) and the Meeting of the Parties. As with the MOP, external observers may take part in AC meetings, while the nominated members are the sole decision makers.

Secretariat
The ASCOBANS Secretariat, located in Bonn, acts as the coordinating body of the Agreement. It gathers and disseminates information to the MOP and the AC. It plays an important role in awareness-raising and provides advice and support to the Parties, assisting them in the implementation of the agreement. It services the sessions of the Meeting of the Parties and meetings of the Advisory Committee. The ASCOBANS Secretariat along with other Regional Agreement Secretariats within the framework of the Bonn Convention is integrated into the Agreements Unit of the CMS Secretariat. The 5th Meeting of the Parties of ASCOBANS (2006) decided that from 1 January 2007 the UNEP/CMS Secretariat would serve as the Secretariat for the ASCOBANS Agreement; and the Executive Secretary of UNEP/CMS would be the acting Executive Secretary of ASCOBANS. The current Acting Executive Secretary is Bradnee Chambers.

Species
The most important species covered by the Agreement are:
harbour porpoise (Phocoena phocoena)
bottlenose dolphin (Tursiops truncatus)
common dolphin (Delphinus delphis)
white-beaked dolphin (Lagenorhynchus albirostris)
Atlantic white-sided dolphin (Lagenorhynchus acutus)
striped dolphin (Stenella coeruleoalba)
Risso’s dolphin (Grampus griseus)
killer whale (Orcinus orca)
long-finned pilot whale (Globicephala melas)
northern bottle-nosed whale (Hyperoodon ampullatus) and
 other beaked whales (Ziphiidae).

Agreement area and member states
ASCOBANS is open for accession by all Range States (i.e. any state that exercises jurisdiction over any part of the range of a species covered by the Agreement or whose flag vessels engage in operations adversely affecting small cetaceans in the Agreement area) and by regional economic integration organisations.

Originally only covering the North and Baltic Sea, as of 3 February 2008 the ASCOBANS Area has been extended to include also the Irish Sea and parts of the North Eastern Atlantic. It is defined as follows:
"… the marine environment of the Baltic and North Seas and contiguous area of the North East Atlantic, as delimited by the shores of the Gulfs of Bothnia and Finland; to the south-east by latitude 36°N, where this line of latitude meets the line joining the lighthouses of Cape St. Vincent (Portugal) and Casablanca (Morocco); to the south-west by latitude 36°N and longitude 15°W; to the north-west by longitude 15°W and a line drawn through the following points: latitude 59°N/longitude 15°W, latitude 60°N/longitude 5°W, latitude 61°N/longitude 4°W; latitude 62°N/ longitude 3°W; to the north by latitude 62°N; and including the Kattegat and the Sound and Belt passages."

Parties

The European Union signed the Agreement, but never ratified it.

Non-party range states

Harbour porpoise conservation
Three action plans for harbour porpoises specific to the situation in different parts of the Agreement Area have been concluded to date.

 Jastarnia Plan, a Recovery Plan for Baltic Harbour Porpoises (2009)
 Conservation Plan for Harbour Porpoises in the North Sea (2009)
 Conservation Plan for the Harbour Porpoise Population in the Western Baltic, the Belt Sea and the Kattegat (2012)

Public reception
Over the years, the Agreement has appeared in a number of newspapers, both national and international. Attention has been drawn to ASCOBANS activities, successes and setbacks. While the WWF praised ASCOBANS’ efforts towards bycatch reduction in 2001, it voiced criticism in 2004 claiming that gaping loopholes in ASCOBANS agreements permit the continued unnecessary killing of small cetaceans by fishermen, and that stronger measures would reduce mammalian bycatch. Meanwhile, in 2005, the TAZ  presented the crucial role ASCOBANS plays in the protection of harbour porpoises in the Baltic Sea – pointing out the successful introduction of a regulation that by 2007 all fishing vessels be equipped with pingers to warn porpoises and hence avert bycatch. In a more recent statement, the Gesellschaft zum Schutz der Meeressäugetiere, GSM, has called for increased attention to the work of ASCOBANS on the wider scale. Some NGOs have voiced concern about possible effects of the changed Secretariat arrangements since January 2007, which they see as weakening the capacity of this body of the Agreement.

Since 2003, the International Day of the Baltic Harbour Porpoise, which is observed each year on the 3rd Sunday in May in institutions throughout the Baltic riparian states, has spread awareness of the plight of the harbour porpoise. The ASCOBANS Secretariat publishes a periodic newsletter, which informs about latest activities. Subscriptions are possible via the ASCOBANS website.

ASCOBANS was a partner to the Year of the Dolphin.

References

External links
ASCOBANS
Background on ASCOBANS
Odontocetes: the toothed whales: Distribution, Behaviour, Migration and Threats

1994 in the environment
Cetacean research and conservation
Environmental policy
Environment of Europe
Treaties concluded in 1992
Treaties entered into force in 1994
Treaties of Belgium
Treaties of Denmark
Treaties of Finland
Treaties of France
Treaties of Germany
Treaties of Lithuania
Treaties of the Netherlands
Treaties of Poland
Treaties of Sweden
Treaties of the United Kingdom
Treaties extended to Jersey
Treaties extended to Guernsey
Convention on the Conservation of Migratory Species of Wild Animals